Dil Dosti Duniyadari is a Marathi television sitcom produced by Sanjay Jadhav and Deepak Rane. It started airing on Zee Marathi from 9 March 2015 and also digitally available on ZEE5. It revolves around six friends living as paying guests in Mumbai with the home owner's nephew Sujay, in a house they affectionately call "Mazghar". The serial's first season concluded on 20 February 2016. The series second season, Dil Dosti Dobara, was a reboot sequel.

Premise 
Dil Dosti Duniyadari is a journey of six friends, all of different shades and colours. Meenal, Anna, Reshma, Sujay, Kaivalya and Ashutosh not only share the same flat but also share their lives with each other. All of them have come to Mumbai with a reason of their own. When destiny brings them together, it becomes a mad man’s world to live in. Each day brings about a new set of fun-filled expeditions for them. No matter how bad the situation is they always stand by each other. The life in this house is no less than a roller coaster ride of emotions. These six individuals have now found family away from family. From here begins a journey of evolving relationships, changing dreams, heartbreaks, countless moments of pain and joy. But most of all an unending journey of lifelong friendship.

Plot 
The plot of Dil Dosti Duniyadari serial begins with a newly married Reshma who leaves her home in Akola to settle with her husband Rakesh. When she reaches Mumbai, Reshma is heartbroken when she finds out that Rakesh has a girlfriend and was unwillingly married to Reshma on receiving threats from his father. Reshma leaves the house and does not know what to do, with her dreams crushed.

Another girl, Meenal, discovers Reshma abandoned and befriends her. She introduces Reshma to her flatmates. Initially they are reluctant to receive her, but soon bond with her mainly because Reshma is a talented cook. The story showcases the friends in various situations, exploring their emotions to the furthest extent and each one learns something new about life. Reshma changes as her friends teach her to live life full of freedom. Reshma and her friends decide not to tell her family the truth, at least until Reva (Reshma's younger sister) is married. Rakesh comes to respect Reshma.

The show concludes when Reshma, Rakesh, Nisha and the friends reach Akola to attend the marriage of Reva. When the marriage is done, Reshma and her friends reveal the truth in front of everyone. Rakesh's father threatens his son to abandon Nisha, but Rakesh, who is also influenced by Reshma's friends, no longer buckles and strongly asserts himself. Reshma tells the complete truth to her parents who understand her. Reshma's father asks her to stay with him. The friends become emotional when they come to know that Reshma will not be coming to them and part ways with her. Reshma reunites with her friends, saying that she would be starting a new life with them, with the permission of her father. The friends become overjoyed and enjoy each other's company. The final shot is when all the six friends happily step on the platform of Dadar station in Mumbai.

Cast

Main 
 Suvrat Joshi as Sujay Sathe (Scholar) - A scholarly intellectual who works in an IT corporate sector and has migrated from Pune. Sujay is the 'Know-it-all' of the house as well as the second eldest member of Mazghar. He is very strict about manners, money and discipline, but at the same time, he cares for all his friends and stands with them in need. He has a sister Piyu, who suffers from schizophrenia, because of which he is overprotective of her. The house, Mazghar, in which all the friends live, is his Kaka's investment flat.
 Amey Wagh as Kaivalya Karkhanis (KK) - A boy from a rich business family who has fled from there to pursue his dreams. He aspires to be a great singer and music composer one day and to show his father the real worth of music. Kaivalya is as proud as a peacock, and has a sarcastic sense of humour but is willing to undertake any task for his friends. Piyu had a crush on Kaivalya. Kaivalya has a strained relationship with his businessman father, Vasant Karkhanis. However, Vasant reconciles with his son and allows him to live life the way he wants.
 Pushkaraj Chirputkar as Aashutosh Shivalkar (Aashu, Bunny) - An unemployed youngster who hails from Yavatmal, he's the eldest member of "Mazghar". He works as a clown for a party organizer to earn his livelihood. Kinjal is the love of his life, who is Gujarati. He always borrows money from his friends and other people and never repays them. He speaks poor English but tries hard to learn. Aashu is the butt of the jokes and is considered goofy and cowardly. But despite his lighthearted surface, Aashu hides a very dark past. He is a former dreaded gangster who worked in the mafia, but he grew disgusted with these criminal activities and decided to redeem himself. He often tells stories of his childhood friend Pamya and forgets each time that he has told everyone about Pamya.
 Pooja Thombre as Anna Mathews - A Catholic girl who is originally from Vasai and works in the fashion industry. She is innocent and naive, being the youngest of all tenants, due to which she is a soft target for others to ridicule. Anna had a sad childhood with her quarrelling parents. Her parents don't believe in her ambition, regardless of which she is working her way out to prove herself to her family and live her dreams.
 Swanandi Tikekar as Meenal Shevale - A girl who has left her Solapur house to become an actress. She is a very open-minded girl and is quite confident about herself. She depicts an independent twenty-first-century city girl. While she appears to be strong and confident, she grieves about the way she and her three little sisters were neglected by their chauvinistic father. She had a crush on the director of her play, Kabir.
 Sakhi Gokhale as Reshma Rakesh Inamdar - She is the newest and only married member of "Mazghar". A young housewife from Akola comes to stay with the others after realising that her husband has married her only for pleasing his strict father, and therefore material gain. In reality, he secretly loves a North Indian girl called Nisha. Dismal and heartbroken, she starts living with the other tenants. With her new friends, she uncovers various aspects of life that she never encountered. She is a talented cook and Aashu considers her a sister.

Recurring 
 Pankaj Khamkar as Rakesh Jagannath Inamdar -  Reshma's estranged husband, also from Akola. He is blackmailed by his father, Jagannath Inamdar, that he can only marry a woman of his Baba's choice, or any other Maharashtrian woman. If he disobeyed, his father would refuse to give him property for his married life. So Jagannath arranges his son's marriage to a girl called Reshma Patil who happens to be in the same city and arranges property for both to live in Mumbai. However, Jagannath nor Reshma have any idea that Rakesh is cheating them by having secret extramarital affairs with a North Indian girl called Nisha. Rakesh is very intelligent, rich, and good at his work, however as a person very selfish, greedy, materialistic, and inconsiderate with Reshma. She believes that Rakesh would realize his mistake finally and come back to her, but her roommates loathe and disdain him. Nevertheless, they still tolerate his antics by never closing the door on Rakesh whenever he comes to Mazghar to visit his wife. Rakesh fears Aashutosh the most, as he once beat him up and hung him upside down a ceiling fan when he berated Reshma. Reshma gives up on Rakesh eventually and accepts him as a friend.
 Kiran Nivalkar as Sam - He owns a food joint and is a friend of the tenants. He has a crush on Pragalbha. His dreams of living his life with Pragalbha are finally fulfilled nearing the end of the series when Kaivalya's tricks make her fall in love with Sam.
 Suvedha Desai as Kinjal - Aashu's English tutor and his love interest. She is a Gujarati.
 Rucha Apte as Supriya Sathe (Piyu) - Sujay's younger sister who has a crush on Kaivalya. She was hidden by Sujay on the grounds that she had a severe mental illness but later revealed. Sujay lovingly calls her bachcha. Doctors confirm that Piyu will gradually recover from her mental condition and return to normal. She is the only one around whom Sujay behaves like a child.
 Shweta Ambikar as Reva Patil - Reshma's younger sister who lives in Akola with her parents. She later marries her boyfriend Ketan.
 Rasika Vengurlekar as Pragalbha Nagaonkar - She is the daughter of the society's strict secretary Mr. Nagaonkar, a man who views unusual situations with a strong cynical eye. She is eccentric and aberrant who frequently changes her love interest from Sujay and Kaivalya, none of which is actually true. In the end, she ended up starting a true relationship with Sam.
Manjiri Pupala as Nisha - A cool and collected North Indian girl, she is Rakesh's love and girlfriend whom he lives with. Jagannath refuses to give property to Rakesh if he marries someone 'off-limits', therefore he doesn't marry her and Reshma instead.
 Lalit Prabhakar as Kabir - A play director who casts Meenal in his plays. He is stern and frequently reprimands Meenal for her inability to cry during sad scenes, therefore the inability to act well. Meenal falls in love with him later, but Kabir is actually married.
 Sayali Phatak as Chinmayee Chaudhari (Chinu), Meenal's friend. She hails from Dhule District in Maharashtra. She wants to be a filmmaker. The roomies helped her to make a documentary on Bachelors living in Mumbai. She halted in Majhghar for a week for her college submission of the same documentary.
 Atul Kasava as Mr. Nagaonkar (secretary of Society)

Awards

Special episode (1 hour) 
 22 March 2015

References

External links 
 Dil Dosti Duniyadari at ZEE5
 

Marathi-language television shows
Zee Marathi original programming
2015 Indian television series debuts
2016 Indian television series endings